KBRW (680 AM) is a non-commercial radio station in Utqiaġvik, Alaska, broadcasting with 10,000 watts of power from a non-directional antenna. KBRW is a Class A station broadcasting on the clear-channel frequency of 680 AM. The station airs public radio programming from the National Public Radio and Native Voice One networks. KBRW also airs some locally originated programming, as well as native affairs, popular music and religious programs.

Licensee Silakkuagvik Communications, Inc. also operates KBRW-FM at 91.9 FM, which airs a different programming schedule from this station.

The KBRW broadcast stream on the Internet (www.kbrw.org and www.kbrwradio.org) is believed to be the northernmost source for broadcast streaming audio on Earth.

Earl Finkler, a longtime station staffer, became known beyond Barrow as an interviewer and commentator.  His commentaries were aired on multiple public radio networks, and also appeared in the Arctic Sounder newspaper.  He remains well known for his association with KBRW even after retiring to his home state of Wisconsin.

As early as 1979, KBRW was the northernmost affiliate of the weekly chart show, American Top 40 with Casey Kasem, which is no longer heard on KBRW.  KBRW's format is a variety of public radio, public and native affairs, religious programming, and popular music.

Translators

History
The station began broadcasting in December 22, 1975 on 680 AM with 1,000 watts. Smaller FM signals were added in 1988. The AM signal was upgraded to 10,000 watts in 1996. Shortly after the upgrade, a fire took the station off the air for several weeks. Thanks to the FM transmitters, broadcasting continued near the villages, while a new transmitter was installed to serve the outlying areas.

References

External links

BRW
Native American radio
NPR member stations
North Slope Borough, Alaska
BRW
Radio stations established in 1975
1976 establishments in Alaska
Utqiagvik, Alaska